Trochaclididae, common name the false top snails, is a family of sea snails, marine gastropod mollusks in the clade Vetigastropoda (according to the taxonomy of the Gastropoda by Bouchet & Rocroi, 2005).

This family has no subfamilies. The subfamily Acremodontinae is a synonym of Ataphridae.

Genera 
 Acremodonta B. A. Marshall, 1983
 Acremodontina  B. A. Marshall, 1995
 † Ataphrus Gabb, 1869 - type genus
 Austrotrochaclis B. A. Marshall, 1995
 Trochaclis Thiele, 1912

References

 Marshall, B.A. 1983: Acremodontinae: a new subfamily of the Trochidae (Mollusca: Gastropoda). National Museum of New Zealand Records 2: 127-130 (p. 127)
 Williams S.T., Karube S. & Ozawa T. (2008) Molecular systematics of Vetigastropoda: Trochidae, Turbinidae and Trochoidea redefined. Zoologica Scripta 37: 483–506
 Marshall, B. A. (1995). Recent and Tertiary Trochaclididae from the southwest Pacific (Mollusca: Gastropoda: Trochoidea). The Veliger 38: 92-115

Further reading
 Gründel J. (November 2008) "Remarks to the classification and phylogeny of the Ataphridae Cossmann, 1915 (Gastropoda, Archaeogastropoda) in the Jurassic". Neues Jahrbuch für Geologie und Paläontologie - Abhandlungen, 250(2): 177–197.